No. 80 Squadron RAF was a Royal Flying Corps and Royal Air Force squadron active from 1917 until 1969. It was operative during both World War I and World War II.

Establishment and early service
Founded on 1 August 1917 at RAF Montrose, equipped with the Sopwith Camel and intended as a fighter squadron, 80 Squadron was sent to France to serve on the Western Front in January 1918, acting initially in a fighter role. However, German offensives in March of the same year resulted in 80 Sqn being reallocated in a ground-attack role, still with Camels. It continued this duty until the end of the war. As a result, the squadron had only one ace, Harold Whistler, although it claimed approximately 60 aerial victories.

The Camels were replaced with Sopwith Snipes in December 1918 and in May the following year the squadron moved to Egypt, where it served for a short period of time before being amalgamated into No. 56 Squadron RAF.

Reinstatement and World War II

The squadron was reformed in March 1937 again as No. 80 Squadron, now equipped with Gloster Gauntlet fighter. However, by now the Gauntlet was considered by many to be outdated, and as a result the Gauntlets were replaced by the Gloster Gladiator just two months later. In 1938, the squadron again returned to Egypt as an 'air defence unit'. After Italy's declaration of war on Britain on 10 June 1940, No. 80 Squadron was moved to the Egyptian-Libyan border but was subsequently one of the units sent to aid the Greeks during the Greco-Italian War, initially flying Gladiators and then re-equipping with the Hawker Hurricane from February 1941.  The Squadron lost most of its aircraft during the Greek and Crete actions and reformed at RAF Aqir in Palestine in May 1941 before deploying detachments to Nicosia in Cyprus and 'A' Flight to RAF Haifa. The Squadron moved totally to Cyprus in July 1941, before returning to Syria the next month, and then joining the fighting in North Africa two months later. During the Battle of El Alamein it was responsible for defending communications lines. It remained in that area until early 1944, when it returned to Britain to prepare for Operation Overlord (the Allied invasion of Europe). It was equipped with the Spitfire IX F operating from RAF Detling in Air Defence of Great Britain (ADGB), though under the operational control of RAF Second Tactical Air Force (2nd TAF). When 2nd TAF began moving to Normandy after D-Day, the squadron remained in ADGB, re-equipping with Hawker Tempest aircraft on anti-V-1 flying bomb duties as part of Operation Diver. After this threat diminished, No. 80 Squadron moved on to the continent and resumed a fighter role until the end of the war in Europe.

Post-World War II and disbandment
As part of the European occupation forces, British Air Forces of Occupation, the squadron continued its patrol and reconnaissance duties from Wunstorf in Germany, until it relocated to Hong Kong in July 1949 (the Tempests having been replaced by Supermarine Spitfire F.24s in 1948). During the Chinese Civil War, No. 80 Squadron's main duty was to defend Hong Kong from perceived Communist threats. The Spitfires departed in 1951, replaced by the de Havilland Hornet, and the squadron remained in Hong Kong until being disbanded on 1 May 1955. However, two months later it was reformed as a reconnaissance unit at RAF Laarbruch. Equipped with Canberra PR.7s, it moved to Brüggen in June 1957 from then until 28 September 1969, when it was disbanded.

Notable members
 David Coke
 Nigel Cullen
 Roald Dahl
 William Vale
 Pat Pattle
 Tap Jones
 Robert (Peter) Spurdle

Aircraft operated

See also
Cathay Pacific VR-HEU

References

Notes

Bibliography
 
 Ken Delve, D-Day: The Air Battle, London: Arms & Armour Press, 1994, .
 Halley, James J. The Squadrons of the Royal Air Force & Commonwealth 1918–1988. Tonbridge, Kent, UK: Air Britain (Historians) Ltd., 1988. .
 Jefford, C.G. RAF Squadrons, a Comprehensive record of the Movement and Equipment of all RAF Squadrons and their Antecedents since 1912. Shrewsbury, Shropshire, UK: Airlife Publishing, 1988 (second edition 2001). .
 Rawlings, John D.R. Coastal, Support and Special Squadrons of the RAF and their Aircraft. London: Jane's Publishing Company Ltd., 1982. .
 Rawlings, John. Fighter Squadrons of the RAF and their Aircraft. London: Macdonald and Jane's Publishers Ltd., 1969 (second edition 1976). .
 Rawlings, J. D. R. "History of 80 Squadron".Air Pictorial, December 1962, Vol. 24, No. 12. pp. 392–394.
 Shores, Christopher. Strike True: The Story of No. 80 Squadron Royal Air Force. Tonbridge, Kent, UK: Air-Britain (Historians) Ltd., 1986. .

External links

 RAFWeb page

080
080
Military units and formations established in 1917
Military of Hong Kong under British rule
1917 establishments in the United Kingdom
Military units and formations in Mandatory Palestine in World War II